Culley may refer to:

Culley (given name), includes a list of people with the given name
Culley (surname), includes a list of people with the surname
F. B. Culley Generating Station, a 369-MWe coal-fired electricity-generating power plant southeast of Newburgh in Warrick County

See also

 Culey (disambiguation)
 Cully (disambiguation)
Curley (disambiguation)